Autumn Gold is a 2010 German documentary film directed by Jan Tenhaven. The film is about senior athletes competing at the Worlds Masters Championships.

Cast
 Alfred Proksch as himself
 Gabre Gabric-Calvesi as herself
 Herbert Liedtke as himself
 Ilse Pleuger as herself
 Jiří Soukup as himself

External links
 
 

German documentary films
2010 films
2010 documentary films
Documentary films about sportspeople
Documentary films about old age
2010s German films